Hordeum chilense is a species of wild barley native to Chile and Argentina. A diploid, it is used or being explored for use in barley crop improvement due to its resistance to Zymoseptoria tritici septoria leaf blotch, its high seed yellow pigment content (YPC), and its cytoplasmic male sterility. It is a parent, along with durum wheat, of the hybrid crop Tritordeum.

References

chilense
Plants described in 1817